Virk is a village near Phagwara, but falls within Tehsil Phillaur, Jalandhar district, in Punjab, India.

Demographics
According to the 2001 Census, Virk has a population of 5,195. Neighbouring villages include Chachoki, Indna Klaske, Paddi Khalsa, Jamalpur and Mouli.

References

Jalandhar
Villages in Jalandhar district